Gerald Wesley Moran (born May 29, 1954) is an American lawyer and politician who is the senior United States senator from Kansas, a seat he has held since 2011. A member of the Republican Party, he was chair of the National Republican Senatorial Committee for the 113th U.S. Congress, during which he led successful Republican efforts in the 2014 election, producing the first Republican Senate majority since 2006. Previously, he was a member of the United States House of Representatives, representing .

Raised in Plainville, Kansas, Moran graduated from the University of Kansas and the University of Kansas School of Law. He worked in private law and was the state special assistant attorney general (1982–85) and deputy attorney of Rooks County (1987–95). He served in the Kansas Senate from 1989 to 1997 and was majority leader for his last two years. He was elected to the House of Representatives in 1996 and spent seven terms there with little electoral opposition. He was elected to the U.S. Senate in 2010 after defeating fellow U.S. Representative Todd Tiahrt in a contentious primary. He was reelected to the Senate in 2016 and 2022.

Moran became the senior senator and dean of the Kansas congressional delegation in 2021 when Pat Roberts retired from the Senate.

Early life, education, and career 
Moran was born in Great Bend, Kansas, the son of Madeline Eleanor (née Fletcher) and Raymond Edwin "Ray" Moran. He was raised in Plainville. He attended Fort Hays State University before enrolling at the University of Kansas in Lawrence, where he earned a Bachelor of Science degree in economics in 1976. While attending the University of Kansas, he worked as a summer intern for U.S. Representative Keith Sebelius in 1974, when impeachment proceedings were being prepared against President Richard Nixon.

Moran worked as a banker before receiving his Juris Doctor from the University of Kansas School of Law in 1982. He practiced law at Stinson, Mag & Fizzell in Kansas City, and later joined Jeter & Larson Law Firm in Hays, where he practiced for 15 years. In addition to his law practice, he served as the state special assistant attorney general (1982–85) and deputy county attorney of Rooks County (1987–95). He also served as an adjunct professor of political science at Fort Hays State University.

Kansas Senate 
Moran served eight years (1989–1997) in the Kansas Senate. He served two years as the vice president and his last two years as majority leader.

U.S. House of Representatives

Elections 
Moran was elected to Congress in 1996 and reelected six times, never facing serious opposition in the conservative 1st district. In 2006, his opponent was John Doll, against whom he received almost 79% of the vote—one of the highest totals for a Republican congressional incumbent in that election.

Tenure 
During his time in the House of Representatives, Moran conducted an annual town hall meeting in each of the 69 counties in Kansas's "Big First" Congressional District. He continues the tradition in the U.S. Senate for all 105 counties.

As a senior member of the House Agriculture Committee, Moran worked with colleagues to craft legislation to aid Kansas farms and ranches. He was also an active member of the House Transportation and Infrastructure Committee and the House Veterans' Affairs Committee, where he served as chair of the Subcommittee on Health.

Slate's David Weigel wrote that, despite his insistence that earmarks are a way to get members of Congress to vote for spending "we can't afford", Moran requested $19.4 million in earmarks in the 2010 budget.

U.S. Senate

Elections 
Moran became the 2010 Republican nominee for U.S. Senate in Kansas after defeating Representative Todd Tiahrt in the Republican primary, 50%–45%. In the general election, Moran defeated Democrat Lisa Johnston, Libertarian Michael Dann, and Reform Party candidate Joe Bellis, with 70% of the vote.

Tenure

Moran was elected chair of the National Republican Senatorial Committee for the 113th U.S. Congress on November 14, 2012. He oversaw the Republican gain of nine Senate seats in the 2014 United States Senate elections, resulting in the first Republican Senate majority since 2006.

On January 5, 2021, Moran announced that he would vote to certify the 2021 United States Electoral College vote count, which was to take place the following day. He was participating in the certification when Trump supporters attacked the United States Capitol. During the attack, Moran tweeted that he condemned "the violence and destruction at the U.S. Capitol in the strongest possible terms. It is completely unacceptable and unpatriotic."

For his tenure as the chairman of the Senate Veterans' Affairs Committee in the 116th Congress, Moran earned an "F" grade from the nonpartisan Lugar Center's Congressional Oversight Hearing Index.

Committee assignments 
Committee on Health, Education, Labor and Pensions
 United States Senate Committee on Appropriations
 Subcommittee on Agriculture, Rural Development, Food and Drug Administration, and Related Agencies
 Subcommittee on Department of Defense
 Subcommittee on Commerce, Justice, Science, and Related Agencies (Chair)
 Subcommittee on Defense
 Subcommittee on Financial Services and General Government
 Subcommittee on Labor, Health and Human Services, Education, and Related Agencies
 Subcommittee on State, Foreign Operations, and Related Programs
 United States Senate Committee on Commerce, Science, and Transportation
 Subcommittee on Aviation Operations, Safety, and Security
 Subcommittee on Communications, Technology, Innovation, and the Internet
 Subcommittee on Consumer Protection, Product Safety, Insurance and Data Security (Chairman)
 Subcommittee on Surface Transportation and Merchant Marine Infrastructure, Safety, and Security
 Senate Committee on Environment and Public Works
 United States Senate Committee on Veterans' Affairs (Ranking Member)
 United States Senate Committee on Indian Affairs

Caucus memberships
 Afterschool Caucuses

Political positions 
Moran's voting record is somewhat conservative. He has a lifetime rating of 86 from the American Conservative Union and a lifetime 71 rating from Club for Growth but in off election years he has a somewhat moderate score, as in 2019 when he scored 32 with Club for Growth.

Agriculture 

In March 2019, Moran was one of 38 senators to sign a letter to United States Secretary of Agriculture Sonny Perdue warning that dairy farmers "have continued to face market instability and are struggling to survive the fourth year of sustained low prices" and urging his department to "strongly encourage these farmers to consider the Dairy Margin Coverage program."

In May 2019, Moran was a cosponsor of the Transporting Livestock Across America Safely Act, a bipartisan bill introduced by Ben Sasse and Jon Tester intended to reform hours of service for livestock haulers by authorizing drivers to have the flexibility to rest at any point during their trip without it being counted against their hours of service and exempting loading and unloading times from the hours of service calculation of driving time.

Health care 
Moran opposed the Medicare reform package of 2003, unlike most congressmen from rural districts. He also opposed the Affordable Care Act (Obamacare).

In May 2011, Moran sponsored S. 1058, the Pharmacy Competition and Consumer Choice Act of 2011. In the House, he served as co-chair of the House Rural Health Care Coalition and co-founder of the Congressional Community Pharmacy Coalition.

Moran voted against the July 2017 Senate health care bill. He criticized the closed-door process for developing the bill and criticized the legislation for not repealing the entire ACA.

National security and military 

Since 2014, Moran has served on the United States Air Force Academy Board of Visitors.

In the early 2000s, Moran opposed a timetable for military withdrawal from Iraq.

Since entering Congress, Moran has traveled to Afghanistan, Iraq, and Pakistan to visit deployed American forces and meet with foreign leaders.  His most recent trip to the region was in August 2017 to the northern regions of Afghanistan.In March 2018, Moran was one of five Republican senators to vote against tabling a resolution spearheaded by Bernie Sanders, Chris Murphy, and Mike Lee that would have required President Trump to withdraw American troops either in or influencing Yemen within the next 30 days unless they were combating Al-Qaeda. In October 2018, Moran was one of seven senators to sign a letter to United States Secretary of State Mike Pompeo expressing that they found it "difficult to reconcile known facts with at least two" of the Trump administration's certifications that Saudi Arabia and the United Arab Emirates were attempting to protect Yemen civilians and were in compliance with U.S. laws on arms sales, citing their lack of understanding for "a certification that the Saudi and Emirati governments are complying with applicable agreements and laws regulating defense articles when the [memo] explicitly states that, in certain instances, they have not done so." In June 2019, Moran was one of seven Republicans to vote to block Trump's Saudi arms deal providing weapons to Saudi Arabia, United Arab Emirates and Jordan, and one of five Republicans to vote against an additional 20 arms sales.

In January 2019, Moran was one of 11 Republican senators to vote to advance legislation intended to block Trump's intent to lift sanctions against three Russian companies.

In February 2019, amid a report by the Commerce Department that ZTE had been caught illegally shipping goods of American origin to Iran and North Korea, Moran was one of seven senators to sponsor a bill reimposing sanctions on ZTE in the event that ZTE did not honor both American laws and its agreement with the Trump administration.

In July 2019, Moran was one of 16 Republican senators to send a letter to Acting Office of Management and Budget (OMB) Director Russell Vought, Acting White House Chief of Staff Mick Mulvaney, and Treasury Secretary Steven Mnuchin encouraging them to work with them to prevent a continuing resolution "for FY 2020 that would delay the implementation of the President's National Defense Strategy (NDS) and increase costs" and writing that the yearlong continuing resolution suggested by administration officials would render the Defense Department "incapable of increasing readiness, recapitalizing our force, or rationalizing funding to align with the National Defense Strategy (NDS)."

Immigration and refugees
Moran critiqued Trump's 2017 executive order imposing a temporary ban on entry to the U.S. to citizens of seven Muslim-majority countries, saying, "While I support thorough vetting, I do not support restricting the rights of U.S. citizens and lawful permanent residents. Furthermore, far-reaching national security policy should always be devised in consultation with Congress and relevant government agencies."

In March 2019, Moran was one of 12 Republican senators to vote to block Trump's national emergency declaration that would have granted him access to $3.6 billion in military construction funding to build border barriers.

Economy 
In May 2019, Moran was one of eight senators to cosponsor the Global Leadership in Advanced Manufacturing Act, a bill that would develop new institutes that supported American manufacturing in technology and grant more federal investment in the national network such as preexisting institutes being made to compete globally as well as continue American economic and national security.

Education 
Moran supports accountability metrics for public schools, but believes federal initiatives need to provide flexibility to states. In 2001, Moran voted against the No Child Left Behind Act (NCLB) because he felt it did not afford sufficient flexibility to schools. In 2017, Moran voted to confirm Betsy DeVos as United States Secretary of Education.

Gun policy
Moran has an "A" rating from the National Rifle Association (NRA) for his consistent support of pro-gun policies. The NRA endorsed him in his 2010 Senate run. NRA-Political Victory Fund chair Chris W. Cox called Moran a "steadfast supporter of our freedom". Since 1998, the NRA has donated $23,850 to Moran's political efforts.

In 2013, Moran joined other Republicans in saying they would filibuster any Democrat's proposals that Republicans considered a threat to the Second Amendment. In April, he voted against the Manchin-Toomey proposal for universal background checks for gun purchases.

Moran supports the concept of eliminating gun-free zones on military installations and recruitment centers. He said that they are an "infringement on the constitutional rights of our service members" and that gun-free zones make military sites "increasingly vulnerable to those who wish to do harm."

In 2016, Moran voted against the Feinstein Amendment, which would have banned suspected terrorists from acquiring guns.

Moran responded to the 2017 Olathe, Kansas shooting, "I strongly condemn violence of any kind, especially if it is motivated by prejudice and xenophobia."

In January 2019, Moran was one of 31 Republican senators to cosponsor the Constitutional Concealed Carry Reciprocity Act, a bill introduced by John Cornyn and Ted Cruz that would grant individuals with concealed carry privileges in their home state the right to exercise this right in any other state with concealed carry laws while concurrently abiding by that state's laws.

Environment and climate change
As of 2017, based on his environment-related votes, Moran had a lifetime score of 8% from the League of Conservation Voters, and a 0% score for 2016.

In 2015 Moran voted against a Senate amendment acknowledging that human activity contributes to climate change. In 2016, Moran and several other Senate Republicans signed a letter calling upon the U.S. to withdraw funding from the United Nations Framework Convention on Climate Change. In 2009, Moran voted against the American Clean Energy and Security Act (Waxman-Markey), which would have established a cap-and-trade system to reduce carbon emissions and combat climate change.

Moran is a strong supporter of the construction of the Keystone XL oil pipeline.<ref>John Hanna, U.S. Sens. Moran, Roberts predicting success on Keystone XL project , 'Topeka Capitol-Journal (November 20, 2014).</ref> During the consideration of the Keystone XL pipeline legislation, he introduced an amendment to remove the lesser prairie chicken from the list of threatened species. The amendment failed on a  54–44 vote, having failed to get the required 60 votes.Keystone XL bill: Lesser prairie chicken amendment is rejected, Associated Press (January 29, 2015).

Entrepreneurship and startups

Moran is "one of the most active members of Congress when it comes to reaching out to Silicon Valley." In 2014, Consumer Electronics Association President and CEO Gary J. Shapiro dubbed Moran "Mr. Innovation" and described him as "one of the biggest tech entrepreneurship leaders in the U.S. Senate." Moran is the lead sponsor of Startup Act 3.0 legislation, which includes several provisions that would reform the American visa system for high-skilled, American-educated, and entrepreneurial immigrants. Moran also sponsored the Jumpstart Our Business Startups Act, also known as the JOBS Act, legislation to expand crowdfunding options for startups. Since its 2012 passage, he has criticized the U.S. Securities and Exchange Commission's JOBS Act rule-making as drawn out and potentially counterproductive to the legislation's intent. Moran is an advocate of increased engagement between Washington and the Startup community and has spoken on the issue at events like South by Southwest (SXSW) and the Consumer Electronics Show (CES).

 Internet issues
Moran opposed the Protect Intellectual Property Act (PIPA) and Stop Online Piracy Act (SOPA). In November 2011, Moran, Senators Rand Paul, Ron Wyden and Maria Cantwell sent a letter to Senate leadership indicating they would place a Senate hold on PIPA, citing the threats PIPA (and SOPA) posed to liberty and innovation.

In 2017, Moran voted to repeal FCC Internet privacy rules that blocked internet providers from sharing or selling data on customers' private data (such as browsing history) without the customer's permission.

 Abortion 
Moran opposes abortion.Dave Ranney, Anti-abortion leader berates Shallenburger's inclusiveness, Lawrence Journal World (August 12, 2005). He has cosponsored legislation to ban abortions after the 20th week of pregnancy. He voted in favor of making harming a fetus a crime. Moran supported the 2022 overturning of Roe v. Wade, agreeing that the Constitution does not ensure right to an abortion.

 LGBT rights 
The Human Rights Campaign has rated his voting record on LGBT rights as zero in five separate scorecards.

 Opioids 
In September 2018, Moran voted for a package of 70 Senate bills that cost $8.4 billion and altered programs across multiple agencies, as part of a bipartisan effort to prevent opioids from being shipped through the U.S. Postal Service and to grant doctors the ability to prescribe medications designed to wean opioid addictions.

SafeSport
In February 2022, on a Nightline'' program about criticisms of the United States Center for SafeSport titled "Sports misconduct watchdog faces crisis of confidence", Moran said that every athlete-victim he visited with "had little or no confidence in SafeSport." He and Senator Richard Blumenthal said that they believe that more transparency is required from SafeSport, which does not make public its investigative findings or arbitration decisions, to protect young athletes, and that SafeSport must make its work public.

January 6 commission
On May 28, 2021, Moran voted against creating an independent commission to investigate the January 6 United States Capitol attack.

Personal life 
Moran lived in Hays for most of his political career. In 2012, he moved to Manhattan to be closer to a major airport in order to cut down on his drive time back to Kansas each weekend. The nearest airport to Hays is Wichita Dwight D. Eisenhower National Airport, three hours southeast; Manhattan is two hours from Wichita and Kansas City. Additionally, Manhattan Regional Airport has direct jet service daily to and from Chicago and Dallas.

At Kansas State University, he was initiated into Alpha Tau Omega on September 28, 2013.

Moran volunteers his time with several community organizations. He is a former trustee of the Eisenhower Foundation, serves on the board of trustees of the Fort Hays State University Endowment Association, and serves on the Executive Committee of the Coronado Area Council of the Boy Scouts of America. He was also the 2008 Honorary Chair of the Law Enforcement Torch Run of the Kansas Special Olympics. Moran and his wife, Robba, have two daughters, Kelsey and Alex. Kelsey graduated from Kansas State University in 2010 and from Georgetown University Law Center in 2015. She is an attorney at Hogan Lovells. Alex studied at Kansas State University and graduated from Kansas State University College of Veterinary Medicine in 2016.

Ratings from political organizations
In the first half of the 116th Congress, Moran received a score of 71 from the American Conservative Union, with an overall lifetime rating of nearly 86. Americans for Democratic Action gave Moran a score of 15% for the same period.

Electoral history

See also 

 United States congressional delegations from Kansas

References

External links 
 Senator Jerry Moran official U.S. Senate website
 Jerry Moran for Senator
 
 
 

|-

|-

|-

|-

|-

|-

|-

1954 births
21st-century American politicians
American Methodists
Methodists from Kansas
Fort Hays State University alumni
Kansas lawyers
Republican Party Kansas state senators
Living people
People from Great Bend, Kansas
People from Rooks County, Kansas
Politicians from Manhattan, Kansas
Protestants from Kansas
Republican Party members of the United States House of Representatives from Kansas
Republican Party United States senators from Kansas
Tea Party movement activists
University of Kansas School of Law alumni